Faith is a 1919 American silent drama film, directed by Charles Swickard. It stars Bert Lytell, Rosemary Theby, and Edythe Chapman, and was released on February 3, 1919.

Cast list
 Bert Lytell as George Farrelly
 Rosemary Theby as Charity Garvice
 Edythe Chapman as Martha Owen
 Edwin Stevens as Abner Harrington
 Nancy Chase as Mrs. Harrington

References

External links

 
 
 

Metro Pictures films
Films directed by Charles Swickard
American silent feature films
American black-and-white films
Silent American drama films
1919 drama films
1919 films
1910s American films